If Only I Could (Chinese: 十年…你还好吗？) is a Singaporean drama produced and telecast on Mediacorp Channel 8. The time-travelling series, which consists of 20 episodes,  The show aired at 9pm on weekdays and had a repeat telecast at 8am the following day and it stars Rui En, Paige Chua, Andie Chen and Elvin Ng as the main characters of the series, will begin its run from 31 May 2016. The drama will be re-aired again, starting on 8 December 2018 at 4:30pm.

Plot
Chen Zhenhao (Rui En) struggles to keep her family together despite a disapproving mother-in-law, an easygoing husband too generous with his meagre earnings (Andie Chen), and a son with hyperactivity.

Huo Xiwen (Paige Chua) endures marital problems with her husband Huang Degang (Elvin Ng) and suffers a miscarriage after an accident.

Zhenhao is later diagnosed with breast cancer, and together with her former schoolmate and rival, Xiwen, who’s also seen her share of misfortune, the pair travel back in time to start their lives over and avoid all the mistakes they’ve made. But the two long-suffering wives realise they’re worse off than before.

Cast

Main cast

Supporting cast

Cameo/special appearance
Note: Only credited cameos are mentioned.

Original soundtrack

Awards and nominations

Star Awards 2017
If Only I Could was nominated for 5 categories; the series won only the Best Theme Song. Said award was later nominated in the Asian Television Award but did not win.

Asian Television Award

Trivia
This was Elvin Ng's second villainous role since The Ultimatum (2009).
Rui En's first role as an aunt. She puts on 4 kg just for this role to make her role looked more realistic.
Rui En, Paige Chua, Elvin Ng and Andie Chen previously starred in Code of Honour (2011). Then, Rui En was Andie Chen's younger sister and in love with Elvin Ng, while Paige Chua was Chen's admirer. For this drama, there is a reshuffle; Paige Chua pairs up with Elvin Ng, while Rui En pairs up with Andie Chen. This also marks the second time the "RuiVin" pair do not play an onscreen couple, after C.L.I.F. 3 - Then, Rui En was paired up with Li Nanxing, while Elvin Ng was paired up with Tracy Lee first, then Sora Ma.
This was Elvin Ng and Tracy Lee's fourth collaboration after No Limits, C.L.I.F. and  C.L.I.F. 3.
This was Tracy Lee's first drama in terms of filming schedule (second chronologically, after Peace & Prosperity) after converting her full-time Mediacorp contract to a per-project one. This move is to allow her to study early childhood education.
This was Malaysian singer Rynn Lim's second Singaporean drama since The Beginning (2007).
This was the first instance of which a theme song is arranged at the end of each episode during the credits. There are two ending sequences in this series - one that begins with Xiwen and another that begins with Daxian. Excluding the first episode, this was the 14th series where News Tonight commentaries are not announced.
The Series reran on weekdays on 5.30pm at Mediacorp Channel 8, succeeding The Dream Makers II.
The title card, as well as shots from the time-traveling tunnel, was shot at the tunnel near Alexandra Technopark.

See also
 List of programmes broadcast by Mediacorp Channel 8
 List of If Only I Could episodes

References

Singapore Chinese dramas
2016 Singaporean television series debuts
2016 Singaporean television series endings
Channel 8 (Singapore) original programming
Singaporean time travel television series
Television series about dysfunctional families
Adultery in television
Television series about cancer
Television series set in 2006
Television series set in 2016